Legislative assembly elections for the Bengal Legislative Assembly were held in January 1937 as part of the 1937 Indian provincial elections.

Seats
The allocation of 250 seats in the assembly was based on the communal award. It is illustrated in the following.

 General elected seats- 78
 Muslim electorate seats- 117
 Urban seats- 6
 Rural seats- 111
 Anglo-Indian electorate seats- 3
 European electorate seats- 11
 Indian Christian electorate seats- 2
 Zamindar seats- 5
 Labour representatives- 8
 Education seats- 2
 University of Calcutta- 1
 University of Dacca- 1
 Women seats- 5
 General electorate- 2
 Muslim electorate- 2
 Anglo-Indian electorate- 1
 Commerce, Industries and Planting seats- 19
 Port of Calcutta
 Port of Chittagong
 Bengal Chamber of Commerce
 Jute Interest
 Tea Interest
 Railways
 Traders Associations
 Others

Results

References

Further sources
 Jahanara Begum: The Bengal Legislature of 1937 and Its Characteristics. Proceedings of the Indian History Congress, Vol. 36 (1975), pp. 485–492 (online version at JSTOR)
 David Denis Taylor: Indian Politics and the Elections of 1937. D.Phil. thesis, University of London 1971. ProQuest Number: 11010433 (online version)
 Shila Sen: Muslim Politics in Bengal 1937-47. Impex India: New Delhi, 1976 (online summary)

1937 elections in India
Bengal Presidency